The Audi A6 is an executive car made by the German automaker Audi. Now in its fifth generation, the successor to the Audi 100 is manufactured in Neckarsulm, Germany, and is available in saloon and estate configurations, the latter marketed by Audi as the Avant. Audi's internal numbering treats the A6 as a continuation of the Audi 100 lineage, with the initial A6 designated as a member of the C4-series, followed by the C5, C6, C7, and the C8. The related Audi A7 is essentially a Sportback (liftback) version of the C7-series and C8-series A6 but is marketed under its own separate identity and model designation.

All generations of the A6 have offered either front-wheel-drive or Torsen-based four-wheel-drive, marketed by Audi as their quattro system. The A6 has also been used as the basis for the company's Allroad models since 1999.

Both petrol and diesel versions of the A6 are offered. These are inline four-cylinder turbocharged engines and more powerful 3-litre units in a V6 configuration with a mechanical compressor.

C4 (Typ 4A, 1994–1997) 

Audi's executive car was previously named the Audi 100 (or Audi 5000 in the United States), and was released in three successive generations (Audi C1, Audi C2 and Audi C3). In 1994, the latest generation (C4) of the Audi 100 received a facelift and was renamed as the Audi A6, to fit in with Audi's new alphanumeric nomenclature (as the full-size A8 had just been introduced). The exterior was changed only slightly from the "C4" Audi 100 – new front and rear lights, new radiator grille, similarly with chassis and engine and transmission choices. The United Kingdom was the first market to receive the A6, as stock of RHD Audi 100s had run out before expected, and before the rest of mainland Europe.

The new engines for the A6 were 1.8-litre 20v inline four-cylinder, 2.0-litre 8v inline four-cylinder, 2.6-litre 12V V6 and 2.8-litre 30v V6 petrol engines, with the 2.3-litre inline five engine being dropped on most markets. For the diesel engines, an inline four 1.9 Turbocharged Direct Injection (TDI), and the inline five (R5) 2.5 TDI were available.

Until 1997, the A6 came with several different engines, two of them turbodiesel, and most of them available with Audi's Torsen-based quattro permanent four-wheel-drive system. The A6 was available with saloon and Avant bodies.

C4 engines 
The C4 design was available with the following engines:

S6 

Upon introducing the C4 series A6, Audi made small revisions to what was previously known as the Audi S4, renaming it the Audi S6; the S4 name would eventually be re-used for a completely different model derived from Audi's smaller Volkswagen Group B platform-based Audi A4. As this was the first S6 model from Audi, it is commonly referred to as the Ur-S6, derived from the German augmentative, "Ursprünglich" (meaning: original). It was available as both a saloon/sedan (type 4A5), and an "Avant" (type 4A9) (estate/wagon) to European and United States customers, but only as a saloon in Canada, Asia and Australia.

The vehicle was available with a standard six-speed manual transmission (five-speed only in North America), and Audi's dynamic Torsen T-1 Quattro permanent four-wheel-drive system.

Audi made a high-performance, 4.2-litre V8 engine (parts code prefix: 077, identification code: AEC) with a Bosch KE-Motronic ECU available as an option in the original European S4s, and made the decision to continue to do so with the S6, making a  version of the 4.2 available as an optional upgrade over the 2.2-litre inline five-cylinder turbo. Unlike the five-cylinder turbocharged version, the V8-powered S6 was supplied with a four-speed automatic transmission as standard but kept the Quattro four-wheel-drive. A six-speed manual gearbox was also available as an option.

Audi S6 PLUS

As a swan song to the C4 platform, an even more powerful, and very limited-production Audi S6 Plus was briefly available to European customers. The S6 Plus, developed by Audi's wholly owned high-performance subsidiary, quattro GmbH, was available for sale during the 1997 model year only (production from June 1996 to October 1997). A total of 952 cars were produced; 855 Avants and 97 saloons.

It was powered by another version of the 32-valve (four valves per cylinder) 4.2-litre V8 engine (parts code prefix: 077, identification code: AHK, later to be seen in the Audi S8 as AKH). It was only available with a revised six-speed manual transmission (parts code prefix: 01E, identification code: DGU) (gear ratios – 1st: 3.500, 2nd: 1.889, 3rd: 1.320, 4th: 1.034, 5th: 0.857, 6th: 0.730), with a final drive ratio of 4.111.

Further revisions were made to the suspension, brakes, and wheels. Standard wheels were 8Jx17 "Avus" cast aluminium alloy wheels, with an optional 7Jx16 alloy wheel for use with winter tyres was also available.

With so much power on tap, the S6 Plus saloon could reach  from a standstill in 5.6 seconds, with the Avant a tenth of a second slower at 5.7 seconds.

C5 (Typ 4B, 1997–2004) 

In February 1997, the introduction of a new A6 (Typ 4B), based on a new design automobile platform – the Volkswagen Group C5 platform, with a new range of engines was announced and appeared in March at the 1997 Geneva Motor Show. This A6 was marketed in the same categories as the BMW 5 Series and the Mercedes-Benz E-Class. The redesigned body had a coefficient of drag of 0.28.

In 2000 and 2001, the "C5" A6 was on Car and Driver magazine's Ten Best list. This A6 was available with a 30-valve 2.4- and 2.8-litre V6 engines, with a numerous other engine configurations available globally. As an alternative to the manual transmission, a five-speed tiptronic automatic transmission was also available.

The C5 saloon variant arrived in mid-1997 in Europe, late 1997 in North America and Australia, and the Avant in 1998. In Canada, there was no Avant (Audi's name for an estate/wagon) available at all in 1998 – Audi dropped the C4 Avant at the end of the 1997 model year, and jumped straight to the C5 Avant in 1998 in conjunction with its release in the US. As a result of complying with FMVSS, the North American models were equipped with front and rear bumpers that protruded several inches further than their European counterparts, with modified brackets and bumper suspension assemblies as result, and child-seat tethers for occupant safety. In compliance with Canadian law, Canadian models received daytime running lights as standard equipment. North American C5 A6 models received the 2.8-litre, 30-valve V6 engine, the 2.7-litre "Biturbo" V6 (also found in the B5 platform S4), and the 4.2-litre 40-valve V8 petrol engine; the two higher-spec. engines were only offered with quattro permanent four-wheel drive. The V8 models arrived with significantly altered exterior body panels, with slightly more flared wheel arches (fenders), revised headlamps and grille design (before being introduced in 2002 to all other A6 models), larger wheels (8Jx17-inch), larger brakes and Torsen-based Quattro permanent four-wheel-drive as standard.

In 2002, the A6 received a facelift, with revised headlight and grille design, exposed exhaust tips, and slight changes to accessory body moldings, and tail light colour from red to amber in North American models. A new host of engines were also introduced. The 4.2-litre V8 engine which arrived in 2001 remained unchanged.

Also new was the multitronic continuously variable transmission, available in most front-wheel drive models. All models, except the 2.0-litre petrol and 1.9-litre TDI, were available with Audi's trademark four-wheel-drive system, Quattro. A four-wheel-drive version of the Avant, with raised ground clearance and slightly altered styling, was sold as the Audi allroad quattro, Audi's first crossover SUV.

The second-generation A6 was on Car and Driver magazine's Ten Best list for 2000 and 2001. The updated 2005 A6 won the World Car of the Year award for 2005. In addition, the facelifted third-generation A6 3.0T won two Car and Driver "comparos" that pitted it against other sedans like the BMW 5 Series, Mercedes-Benz E-Class, Jaguar XF, and Infiniti M.

A long wheelbase version of the A6 C5 was available in China for the first time, making this model the first stretched German sedan developed especially for that country.

 S6 and RS 6 

It was available as a saloon and Avant although the Avant version was the only one sold in North America.

In the late years of the A6 C5 design, an ultra-high-performance limited-run Audi RS 6 model was presented. Initially available as only an Avant, a saloon variant was later added; the saloon version being the only version available to the North American market. The RS 6 saloon finished first in a May 2003 Car and Driver comparison test against the BMW M5 (E39), Mercedes-Benz E 55 AMG (W210), and Jaguar S-Type R.

 allroad quattro (1999–2005) 

Audi's C5 series A6 Avant formed the basis for a semi-offroad model in 1999, labeled "Audi allroad quattro". Compared to the regular A6, the allroad featured an advanced air suspension system, allowing for increased ground clearance; larger  diameter all-terrain tyres, and flared fenders and bumpers with matte finish, giving it a distinct appearance and more overall flexibility over varying terrain. The allroad's ride height was also increased with 25mm subframe spacers; and overall frame stiffness increased with reinforced welds on the subframe mounts and A, B, and C pillars, the floor pan being produced with 20% thicker steel. As the name "allroad Quattro" suggests, Audi's Torsen-based quattro permanent four-wheel-drive system was standard equipment for all versions.

The standard adjustable air suspension system can lift the car high enough to provide  of ground clearance; a low-range mode (an option with manual transmission), absent from other Quattro-equipped vehicles, can be selected with the touch of a button. When used together, the two systems made it possible for the allroad to complete an official Land Rover test-course, thus far it is the only car-based SUV that has been proven capable of doing so in testing.

A variant of the corporate 4.2-litre V8 petrol engine, was made available in 2003, and a less powerful TDI (163 bhp) followed in 2004.

Audi stopped production of the allroad in July 2005. Although the model continued to be available for sale throughout 2006 in Europe, there was no 2006 model year for North America.

With the return of the "allroad" nameplate to North America, in the form of the 2013 A4 allroad Quattro, the C5-Platform allroad Quattro has begun to take the name "Ur-allroad." The 'Ur-' is used in the German language, as a prefix to signify 'ancient' or 'early ancestor' (e.g., great-grandmother is Urgroßmutter), and is used informally by car enthusiasts worldwide to refer to the original Audi Quattro that was produced from 1980 to 1991 (the "Ur-Quattro"). The use of the term was then extended to the original S4 and S6 models to differentiate them from later models with the same name, and more recently to the C5 allroad models ("Ur-allroad").

 C5 engines 
The C5 design was available with the following engines:

 C6 (Typ 4F, 2004–2011) 

Initial release
The Typ 4F A6 was released in 2004. Like other contemporary Audis, the A6 has a "tornado line" that runs from the front lights to the rear lights just below the body shoulders.

The C6 iteration of the A6 features more sophisticated technology. Most notable is the Multi Media Interface (MMI), which is a system controlling in-car entertainment, satellite navigation, climate control, car settings such as suspension configuration and optional electronic accessories through a central screen interface. This has the advantage of minimising the wealth of buttons normally found on a dashboard by replacing them with controls that operate multiple devices using the integrated display.

On the engines, the new Fuel Stratified Injection (FSI) direct injection technology was introduced. Although the line of engines represents the same progression as the former model, all engines were new. The multitronic continuously variable transmission continues as an alternative for front-wheel-drive models, alongside a new six-speed tiptronic automatic transmission model 0AW available in the four-wheel-drive models. Audi's "trademark" Torsen-based Quattro permanent four-wheel-drive is available in most of the lineup, and standard in the most powerful models. Quattro is not available on the Multitronic variants of the A6, but is available on the manual and Tiptronic gear systems. Conversely, the Tiptronic system is not available on the front-wheel-drive variants of the car. The six-speed manual gearbox is available with the 3.2-litre V6 engine, but not for the North American market.

The Avant was previewed by the Audi Avantissimo concept in 2001 and arrived during the course of 2005. The A6 All-road Quattro made its debut in 2006, and as before, is an off-road-ready version of the Avant, available with either a 2.7-litre V6 or 3.0-litre V6 Turbocharged Direct Injection diesel engines, or a 3.2-litre V6 or 4.2-litre V8 petrol engine.

A6L (2005–2009)
This is a long wheelbase version of the A6 sedan for the Chinese market. The vehicle was unveiled in 2005 at the Shanghai Motor Show.

The vehicles went on sale in the middle of 2005. Early models include A6L 2.4, with A6L 2.0 TFSI (170 PS) followed shortly after. A6L 3.0 Quattro (218 PS) and A6L 4.2 Quattro (335 PS) were introduced in 2005. Other models include A6 3.0.

S6

The Audi S6 performance variant was introduced in the Frankfurt Motor Show, and produced from early 2006 until 2011. The S6 reaches  from a standstill in 5.2 seconds and a quarter mile in 13.5 seconds.

 A6 allroad quattro (2006–2011) 

Audi announced the C6 series allroad in 2005 and released it the following year. This model was called the Audi A6 allroad quattro (unlike the previous version, the Audi allroad quattro, with no reference to the A6 nomenclature).

The Audi A6 allroad quattro again featured adaptive air suspension and quattro permanent four-wheel drive system.

The 6-speed "Tiptronic" automatic transmission system converted high-torque engine power into both sporty performance and operating convenience, with crisp, fast gear changes. Advanced electronics respond efficiently to all driver input in both D (Drive) and S (Sport) programmes, helping to prevent unwanted upshifts when cornering.

The car featured a number of off-road styling cues including larger bumpers and sills.

In some European markets, this A6 allroad quattro was more expensive than the larger Audi Q7, but an air suspension is an expensive option in the Q7. In its native country, Germany, it cost a few hundred Euros less than the Q7.

Engines

Awards
In 2005, the A6 won the World Car of the Year award, and has also won the Practical Caravan "Towcar of the Year" awards, due to its array of towing features such as adjustable suspension height and damping, and the presence of a 123 Trailer Stability Programme.

 C6 facelift 

Audi unveiled a facelifted "C6" Audi A6 on 12 August 2008, at the Moscow International Motor Show. The refresh incorporates some modern Audi design cues to keep the A6 current with the rest of the Audi lineup.

There are minor cosmetic changes to the front and rear lights which now have daytime running LEDs, the taillights extend towards the center of the trunk lid and pinch off at the license plate mount, however, their shape remains rectangular compared to the more sculpted light clusters found in the 2008 Audi A5, 2008 Audi A4, and 2009 Audi Q5 (the latter three being all-new generations).

The intakes below the headlamps are inspired by the Audi RS5. The A6's six (per side) front light-emitting diode (LED) daytime running lights (DRLs) are located within the main headlamp housing, similar to RS6's placement of the LEDs (ten per side), whereas on the S6 these front LEDs (five per side) are found adjacent to the fog lamps in the lower front bumper.

The new front and rear fascias from RS6 would be used on the facelifted A6 and S6 lineup.

There are now six petrol and four diesel engines available for the upgraded A6. All petrol engines now feature cylinder-direct Fuel Stratified Injection (FSI) technology, and all diesel engines now feature common rail (CR) and Turbocharged Direct Injection (TDI) technologies. There is a new petrol engine, a  3.0L supercharged V6, badged as 3.0 TFSI or 3.0T. This new engine is shared with the B8-generation Audi S4 and S5, although slightly detuned vs. the S-cars, and makes the A6 3.0T only 0.1s slower 0- than the more powerful but heavier 4.2L V8 variant and 5.2L V10-bearing S6.

Also updated for 2009 is the Quattro all-wheel-drive setup, which is already found on the 2008 Audi A5 and 2008 Audi A4. This new system features a 40/60 front-to-rear torque split and offers a more balanced feel, reducing the understeer that comes from 50/50 AWD platforms.

US models went on sale as 2009 model year vehicles, and arrived in U.S. dealerships by the beginning of January. Early models include A6 3.2 FSI (sedan), A6 3.0 TFSI quattro (sedan/Avant), A6 4.2 FSI quattro (sedan), S6 5.2 FSI (sedan).

RS6 (2008–2010)

The latest version of ultra-high-performance Audi RS6 was launched in September 2008 and produced until the third quarter of 2010. Based upon the V10 engine powering the S6, the RS6 features an all-aluminium alloy  V10 twin-turbocharged, Fuel Stratified Injection engine with a dry sump lubrication system. This has now been surpassed by the Audi R8.

Initially available only as an Avant, the saloon version went on sale in mid-October 2008.

A6L (2009–2012)

The A6L is a longer wheelbase version of the A6 sedan for the Chinese market. The vehicle was unveiled at Auto Shanghai 2009. Early models included the 2.7 TDI powerplant (189 PS).

The Audi A6L was also converted into the form of a pickup truck although only two examples are known to exist on the roads.

C6 facelift engines

Safety

  C7 (Typ 4G, 2011–2018) 

Initial release
The fourth generation C7 series Audi A6 (internally designated Typ 4G) was launched in early 2011 for the European market and in other markets soon after. It is heavily influenced by the Audi A8 (D4), pulling elements from its exterior details. The A6 shares its interior, platform, and powertrain (Modular Longitudinal Platform) with the Audi A7 four door sedan, which had been released shortly before also in 2011. Compared to the A8 and A7, the A6 has the most aggressive front fascia and LED headlights (optional full LED headlamps). Design work began in 2006, with Jurgen Loffler's exterior design being chosen in 2008.

The redesign also decreased the car's drag coefficient to 0.25.

The European A6 3.0 TFSI will have an optional seven-speed dual-clutch transmission and an air suspension option, two features that will not be available on the United States model.

There is also an Audi A6 2.0 TFSI quattro powered by a 2.0-litre turbocharged inline-four, the same engine in the Audi A4 and Q5, mated to an eight-speed automatic transmission. For the United States but not the Canadian market, there will be an entry-level Audi A6 2.0 TFSI FrontTrak (front-wheel drive) with a 2.0-litre turbocharged inline-four, the same engine in the Audi A4 and Q5, but mated to the Multitronic CVT (continuous variable transmission).

The 2012 model year A6 features all the driver assistance systems from the A8, plus it adds automotive head-up display, active lane assist. Full LED headlamps with Automatic high beam switching or Audi adaptive light (Xenon) with variable headlight range control.

C7 facelift (2015–2018)

Audi unveiled the 2015 C7 mid-life facelift at the 2014 Paris Motor Show. The refresh includes styling tweaks to the car's exterior, engine line-up, transmission and MMI infotainment system with faster Tegra 3 processor, Handwriting recognition, Audi connect Telematics with 4G mobile internet (and online updates for the navigation map), and advanced Matrix LED headlights.

All three TFSI 1.8tfsi and five TDI engines now meet the Euro 6 emission standard. The new TDI Ultra model now comes with glass fiber-reinforced polymer (GFRP) springs and both ultra models now come with S-Tronic (dual-clutch) transmission. The entry-level Audi A6 2.0 TFSI FrontTrak (front-wheel drive) with a 2.0-litre turbocharged inline-four, received a seven-speed dual-clutch automatic that replaced the previous Multitronic CVT (continuously variable transmission).

A6 hybrid (2012–2014)

A hybrid electric variant was also available for the first time in the A6, offering a 2-litre TFSI  engine combined with a  electric motor.

The market launch of the A6 Hybrid was scheduled for 2012. However, production of the US model was delayed.

The Audi A6 hybrid was discontinued due to low sales in 2014 after roughly 4,000 units sold.

A6 allroad quattro (2012–present)

The 2013 A6 allroad Quattro was unveiled at the 2012 Geneva Motor Show, alongside the 2012 RS4 Avant. Sales began in 2012. The first UK deliveries arrived in July 2012.

The allroad variant contains several unique features. Audi designed more than 1,100 new, unique parts for the allroad, setting it apart from the standard A6 and making it a true all-terrain vehicle. Most obvious, the allroad received special bumpers and fender flares, giving it an aggressive offroad appearance. The bumpers and fender flares feature a tough-wearing, matte finish, contrasting the rest of the body. The roof received this same coating, as well as four longitudinal ribs for increased strength. The unique bumpers also have integrated aluminum skid plates. The allroad featured larger diameter tires than the standard A6 for improved offroad capabilities. Redesigned headlights, larger side mirrors, and a lack of door "rub strips" are unique to the allroad.
	
The allroad comes standard with an adjustable air suspension system can lift the car high enough to provide  of ground clearance; a low-range mode (an option with manual transmission), absent from other quattro-equipped vehicles, can be selected with the touch of a button. When used together, the two systems made it possible for the allroad to complete an official Land Rover test-course, thus far it is the only car-based SUV that has been proven capable of doing so in testing.

It went on sale in spring 2012. Early variants included 3.0 TFSI quattro (310 PS), 3.0 TDI quattro (204 PS), 3.0 TDI quattro (245 PS), 3.0 TDI quattro (313 PS).

A6 L (2012–2018)
The A6 L (built in China for the Chinese market as a long wheelbase alternative to the standard A6) was unveiled in 2012 in Guangzhou International Sports Arena. Early models include A6 L TFSI, A6 L 30 FSI, A6 L 35 FSI, A6 L 35 FSI quattro, A6 L 50 TFSI quattro.

S6 (2012–2018)

Other options include xenon plus headlights with an all-weather light, LED rear lights, an electromechanical parking brake, driver information system with color display, MMI radio plus includes a Bluetooth interface, Audi sound system with ten speakers, MMI navigation plus (hard drive, an eight-inch monitor, MMI touch input system), 15-speaker Bang & Olufsen Advanced Sound System.

The S6 sedan was unveiled at the 2011 Frankfurt Motor Show.

S6 sedan and Avant models went on sale in spring 2012.

A6L e-tron 

The concept vehicle was unveiled in Auto China 2012 in Beijing.

It is a plug-in hybrid version of A6 L with 2.0 TFSI  engine combined with a  electric motor. Other features include MMI navigation plus developed in Audi Infotainment Tech Center (ITC) in Beijing.

The series production plug-in hybrid car will be available in China in 2016 on the long-wheelbase version, using the same hybrid vehicle powertrain like the concept vehicle. All-electric range will be . Acceleration from 0– takes 8.4 seconds. Fuel consumption will be .

A6 Black Edition (2013–)
Available in Saloon and Avant bodies, they are versions of A6 S line with 177 PS 2.0-litre TDI or higher engines (excluding S6) in front-wheel-drive or Quattro all-wheel-drive configurations, for the UK market. It included 20-inch rotor-design alloy wheels with a dark titanium finish, black grille, number plate surrounds and window frame strips, and privacy glass extending from the B-pillar rearwards; black roof rails, Piano Black inlays, sports seats upholstered in black Valcona leather, black headlining, BOSE audio system with DAB radio, Audi Music Interface (AMI) for iPod connection.

Sales began in November 2012, with deliveries began in early 2013.

RS6 Avant (2013–2018)

Optional packages includes customized quattro badges on the central front air inlet. Carbon appearance package includes alternate front splitter and diffuser shapes. Other options include LED headlights with a unique design, the sport differential on the rear axle, Comfort package, head-up display, the high-performance driver assistance systems, Bang & Olufsen Advanced Sound System with 15 speakers and 1,200 watts of total power, Bluetooth online car phone.

Body styles

A6L with 2.0 TFSI (180 PS) was sold as A6L TFSI in China.

In the US, Canada, UK A6 Saloon with 3.0 TFSI Quattro (310 PS) replaced the A6 3.0 TFSI Quattro (300 PS).

In the UK, A6 Avant with 3.0 TFSI Quattro (310 PS) replaced the A6 3.0 TFSI Quattro (300 PS).

Engines 

For A6 3.0 TDI Quattro (245PS), the 580 N-m model replaced the 500 N-m model in the UK.

Transmissions 

For A6 Saloon 3.0 TFSI Quattro (310 PS), 7-speed S-Tronic is used in the UK model, 8-speed Tiptronic is used in the US, Canada models.

A6 3.0 TDI quattro (313 PS) was sold as A6 3.0 BiTDI quattro in the UK.

Safety

Marketing
As part of the Audi A6 Avant launch in the UK, BBH London, Knucklehead, The Whitehouse, The Mill produced the 'Hummingbird' TV commercial, directed by Daniel Barber. The commercial premiered during the ITV1's coverage of the Rugby World Cup. The commercial was to imagine what a bird designed by Audi would look like and to reflect the car's ultra-lightweight technology. Johann Strauss's 'Open Road, Open Sky' was sung by legendary American baritone and automobile lover John Charles Thomas. In addition, 60 second and 30 versions of the ads were supported by press, print and radio campaigns, as well as a presence on the Daily Telegraph's iPad app.

As part of Audi A6 launch in Taiwan, 2011 Audi Fashion Festival featured the theme of 'A6- The sum of Progress', including Shiatzy Chen, Kiki Huang, Robyn Hung and an artistic jewelry brand, Chen Chan.

As part of 2013 Audi S6 sedan launch in the US market, 3 different versions of 'Prom' commercial were premiered during 2013 Super Bowl game. The 60-second ad, created by Venables Bell & Partners, features a teenage boy. Voters were to decide their favourite version of the commercial 24 hours on Friday before the Super Bowl game, with winning entry shown on Saturday at Audi's YouTube channel and during the actual game at CBS.

As part of RS6 Avant launch, Audi Land of Quattro Alpen Tour 2013 featured RS6 Avant begins on September 23, travelling across twelve driving stages in 6 countries (Klagenfurt – the capital of Carinthia, Austria, Monaco).

In the Audi RS6 Avant TV commercial titled 'Perfect Fit', it featured a 2012 Audi R18 with the high downforce sprint bodywork in the guise of Audi R18 e-tron quattro.

C8 (Typ 4K, 2018–present)

A6 Sedan (2018-)
The new A6 was unveiled ahead of the 2018 Geneva Motor Show, and went on sale in June 2018. All engines are offered with a mild hybrid drivetrain that can reduce fuel consumption by up to 0.7 litres per 100 kilometres for the V6-engined vehicles. The A6 will be offered in 7 new exterior colors and 7 colors which are available in current models.

German models went on sale in June 2018. Early models include 50 TDI quattro.

A6 Avant (2018-)

The fifth generation of the A6 is also available as an 'Avant' (Audi terminology for a station wagon). High-performance variants of the 'Avant' will also be produced, with the S6 Avant arriving in 2019 alongside the RS6 Avant.

Early European models include 40 TDI, 45 TDI, 50 TDI.

S6 Sedan, S6 Avant (2019-)

3.0 TDI model includes  electric powered compressor, Euro 6d temp emission standard compliance.

European models went on sale in summer 2019. Early United States, Asia and Middle East models include 2.9 TFSI.

A6 allroad quattro, 20 years allroad edition model (2019-)
20 years allroad includes a choice of 3 body colours (gavial green, glacier white, Soho brown), 19-inch wheels in exclusive design, black sport seats with leather/Alcantara upholstery, aluminum inlays and illuminated door sill trims.

European models went on sale in June 2019. Early models include 45 TDI, 50 TDI, 55 TDI.

RS 6 Avant (2019-)
The centre diff has a 40:60 torque split front to rear, but in certain situations can direct up to 70 per cent of the power forwards or as much as 85 per cent to the rear wheels and is also fitted with wheel-selective torque control. The RS 6 has RS adaptive air suspension or RS sport suspension plus with Dynamic Ride Control (DRC), progressive steering, Audi drive select dynamic handling system with six profiles, 21-inch cast aluminum wheels in 10-spoke star design with 275/35 size tires (optional 22-inch 5-V-spoke trapezoid design wheels in silver, matt titanium look, gloss turned finish, and gloss anthracite black, gloss turned finish with 285/30 tires),  front and  rear steel brake discs with black (optional red) calipers (RS ceramic brakes includes  front and  brake discs with gray, red or blue calipers), 'RS Monitor' MMI touch response display, optional head-up display, aluminium shift paddles, RS and RS 6 logos at steering wheel interior, seats and the illuminated front door sill trims; seats in black pearl Nappa leather/Alcantara upholstery with RS embossing and rhombus pattern (optional perforated Valcona leather with honeycomb pattern and RS embossing), optional carbon, wood natural, gray-brown, or matt aluminum inlays, optional swiveling trailer towing hitch with electric release, optional camera-based trailer assist. RS design packages (red and gray) includes steering wheel rim, gear lever gaiter and knee pads in Alcantara with contrasting stitching; belt straps with color edging, RS floor mats.

European models went on sale in end of 2019.

A6 e-tron concept (2021)
Based on A6/A7 Sportback body, it included 22-inch wheels, LED projectors built in into each side of the body, 100 kWh battery.

The vehicle was unveiled in Auto Shanghai 2021, followed by 2021 Milan Design Week.

Engines
All variants are offered in mild hybrid engines as standard, which include a 48-volt MHEV system.

Transmission 
All variants can come with either a 7-speed S-Tronic DCT and 8-speed "Tiptronic" automatic.

Markets

North America

The 2019 Audi A6 Sedan made its North American debut at the 2018 New York International Auto Show. At that time, Audi had stated that the A6 Avant will not be sold in the United States, however the new RS6 Avant will be sold in the US for the first time in 2020. The A6 allroad is also on sale for the first time in the United States and Canada for the first time since 2005.

Asia 
 China - The fifth-generation Audi A6L was listed for the Chinese market in January 2019. Engine choices available consist of two turbocharged petrol engines: a 2-litre unit and a 3-litre unit. Both are equipped with a 7-speed dual-clutch gearbox as standard. Trim levels consist of the 40, 50, and 55 trims and are all TFSI models. Price ranges for the January 2020 exchange rate are between 409,800 yuan and 650,800 yuan (US$59,000 and 93,700).
 India - The fifth generation of the Audi A6 will be the first generation of the A6 to be assembled and sold in India. It will launch in May 2019.
 Bangladesh - The fifth generation of the Audi A6 will be the first generation of the A6 to be sold in Bangladesh.
 Thailand - The fifth generation of the Audi A6 will be the first generation of the A6 to be sold in Thailand.
 Brunei - The A6 was launched since end of 2019/early 2020 in Brunei with offered its trims: 2.0-litre engine (40 TFSI) and 3.0-litre Quattro engine (55 TFSI).

Europe

Awards
Audi A6 allroad quattro won Auto Bild Allrad's All-Wheel Drive Car of the Year under the Crossover category.

Production
Following the launch of the new A6, Audi officially stopped production of the A6 and A7 TDI vehicles using V6 TDI Gen2 evo EU6 engines due to an investigation on newly discovered emissions cheating software.

Use in China
According to Dunne & Company, a research company, as of 2011, purchases in China and Hong Kong make up about half of the 229,200 Audi A6s sold in the world. By 2012 many government officials in China began driving with Audi A6s. After a 1994 campaign from the Chinese government to have officials stop driving Mercedes stretch limousines, the officials began using black Audi A6 cars. Michael Wines of The New York Times wrote that "More than a perk, the black Audi is a rolling advertisement for its occupant’s importance and impunity in a nation obsessed with status."

Renaming
In March 2023, Audi CEO  confirmed that the A4 would be renamed the A5, while the A6 would become the A7, with the future A4 and A6 to be sold as electric vehicles only.

References

External links 

Audi A6 at Audi corporate website

A6
All-wheel-drive vehicles
Euro NCAP executive cars
Executive cars
Front-wheel-drive vehicles
Vehicles with CVT transmission
Full-size vehicles
Plug-in hybrid vehicles
Sedans
Station wagons
Cars introduced in 1994

2000s cars
2010s cars
2020s cars